Unsound is the fifth and final studio album by American post-punk band Mission of Burma. Released in July 2012, it is their first and only record for Fire Records.

Critical reception

Unsound has been well received by critics. At Metacritic, which assigns a normalized rating out of 100 to reviews from mainstream critics, the album has received an average score of 76, based on 27 reviews, indicating "generally favorable reviews".

Track listing
"Dust Devil" - 1:58
"Semi-Pseudo-Sort-Of Plan" – 4:13
"Sectionals in Mourning" – 2:58
"This Is Hi-Fi" - 3:31
"Second Television" – 3:39
"Part the Sea" – 3:10
"Fell-->H2O" – 3:53
"Add in Unison" – 4:07
"7's" – 2:12
"What They Tell Me" – 2:35
"Opener" – 2:17

References

External links 
 

2012 albums
Fire Records (UK) albums
Mission of Burma albums